Thierry Ardisson (born 6 January 1949, Bourganeuf, Creuse), is a French television producer and host  and a movie producer.

Many of his shows have some of the longest run times on French television, such as Paris Dernière, Tout le monde en parle, and On a tout essayé. He is the author of several books, including best-sellers (Louis XX – Contre-enquête sur la Monarchie and Confessions d’un Babyboomer). In 2013, he released and produced the French movie Max.

Biography 
Ardisson's parents were originally from Nice, in southern France. His father, a construction worker, and mother settled for a short while in Bourganeuf (Creuse) where Ardisson was born.

Early career in advertising and journalism 

In 1969, Ardisson moved to Paris to start a career in advertising. He was first hired at BBDO, then at TBWA, and later at Ted Bates, before founding his own agency, Business, in 1978 with Éric Bousquet and Henri Baché.

While working at Business, Ardisson invented the 8-second TV ad format to allow low-budget advertisers to access television media. As a copywriter, he wrote a number of memorable slogans for French consumers. Business also sold articles to French newspapers and magazines. As a writer, he contributed to the underground magazine, Façade.

In 1984, Ardisson was hired as the vice-director of publications for the Hachette-Filipacchi press group. His editorial decisions were considered too provocative and led to his discharge. But in 1992, he worked a new partnership with Hachette-Filipacchi and launched the magazine Entrevue. He sold his shares of the company back to Hachette-Filipacchi in 1995.

In 1998, Ardisson launched the consumer magazine J’économise (“I save up”) which peaked at 420,000 prints.

Career in television 
In 1980, in the course of the interviews that his agency Business conducted for French newspapers and magazines, Ardisson interviewed French tennis player Yannick Noah who admitted to smoking hashish and that tennis players regularly took amphetamines before the games, a scandal that led to his first appearance on television.

In 1985, Ardisson adapted his press interviews (called Descente de police) for the French TV network TF1, but the concept – too brutal and provocative – got censored by French media authorities. TF1 kept him to host the show Scoop à la une. He then coproduced the show À la folie pas du tout from 1986 to 1987, hosted by later-famous news anchor host, Patrick Poivre-d’Arvor.

In 1987, Ardisson sold his shares of his advertising agency Business and founded the TV production company Ardisson & Lumières.

From 1987 to 1988, Ardisson produced for the TV network La Cinq the show Face à Face, hosted by Guillaume Durand, as well as Bains de minuit, a late-night show shot in the then-trendy night club Les Bains Douches that he hosted. From 1988 and 1990, he hosted the show Lunettes noires pour nuits blanches, shot in the parisian theater Le Palace and aired on French TV channel Antenne 2. For this show, he created the concept of “formatted interviews” such as “interview first time,” “self-interview” or “stupid questions.” During the same period, he coproduced the show Stars à la Barre.

Afterwards, Ardisson hosted the show Télé Zèbre, which introduced two famous French comedians: Yvan Le Bolloc'h and Bruno Solo. From 1991 to 1992, he hosted the late-night game show Double jeu with Laurent Baffie, a show that was also considered too provocative and was canceled by TV network Antenne 2 in early 1993. From 1992 to 1994, he produced the shows Frou-Frou, Graines de Stars and Flashback.

In 1995, Ardisson produced and hosted Paris Dernière on the French cable channel Paris Première. In 1997, he hosted Rive droite / Rive gauche with Frédéric Beigbeder, Élisabeth Quin and Philippe Tesson.

In 1998, Ardisson joined France 2 (formerly Antenne 2) to host Tout le monde en parle each Saturday at prime time, alongside Laurent Ruquier, Linda Hardy, Kad et Olivier and Laurent Baffie.

From 2003 to June 2007, Ardisson hosted 93, faubourg Saint-Honoré on Paris Première, a dinner in his parisian apartment with a panel of various celebrities.

At the end of the 2005–2006 season, Ardisson left France 2 after a contractual disagreement (regarding his involvement with the competing TV channel, Paris Première) and joined the French semi-private TV network Canal+. Since November 2006, he has produced and hosted the show Salut les Terriens ! every Saturday night at access prime time. The show attracted 750K viewers the first year it ran.

Starting in December 2010, Ardisson hosted the show Tout le monde en a parlé for the TV channel Jimmy. The show aired three seasons.

In October 2014 the audience of the show Salut les Terriens! reached 1.4 million viewers, which made it the most popular show for Canal+.

Career in film 
In 2005, Ardisson created the Ardimages group to produce feature films and television series.

In 2012, Ardisson produced his first feature film, Max, directed by Stephanie Murat with Joey Starr  and Mathilde Seigner, and distributed by Warner Bros.

In 2013, Ardisson began producing a second feature film, The Gift, directed by Jean-Paul Rouve and starred Michel Blanc, Annie Cordy, Chantal Lauby and Audrey Lamy.

Career in radio 
On 29 August 2014 Ardisson joined  Laurent Ruquier’s "Les Grosses Têtes" on RTL.

Personal life 

In 2014 Ardisson married French journalist Audrey Crespo-Mara.

Broadcasts 

 1985 : Descente de police on TF1
 1985–1986 : Scoop à la une on TF1
 1987–1988 : Bains de minuit on La Cinq
 1988–1990 : Lunettes noires pour nuits blanches on Antenne 2
 1990–1991 : Télé zèbre on Antenne 2
 1991–1992 : Double jeu on Antenne 2
 été 1992 : Le bar de la plage on France 2
 1993 : Ardimat on France 2
 1994 : Autant en emporte le temps on France 2
 1994 : Long courrier on France 2
 1995–1997 : Paris Dernière on Paris Première
 1997–2004 : Rive droite / Rive gauche on Paris Première
 1998–2006 : Tout le monde en parle on France 2
 2001–2002 : Ça s'en va et ça revient on France 2
 2003–2004 : Opinion publique on France 2
 2003–2007 : 93, faubourg Saint-Honoré on Paris Première
 2010–2014 : Happy Hour on Canal+
 Since 2006 : Salut les Terriens ! on Canal+
 Since 2010 : Tout le monde en a parlé on Jimmy

 Special Broadcasts 
 June 1990 : Rolling Stones : les jumeaux impossibles on Antenne 2
 January 1993 : Cœur d'Ardishow on France 2
 2001 : La Nuit Gainsbourg on France 2
 October 2002 : Bedos/Ardisson : on aura tout vu ! on France 2
 2002 : Le père noël n'est pas une ordure on France 2
 June 2002 : Spéciale Maillan-Poiret on France 2
 April 2003 : Le Grand Blind Test on France 2
 2004 : 60e anniversaire du Débarquement (avec Michel Drucker) on France 2
 April and May 2005 : Le Plus Grand Français de tous les temps on France 2
 April 2008 : Ardisson : 20 ans d'antenne on Jimmy

Bibliography

Novels 
 Thierry Ardisson, Cinemoi, Paris, Éditions du Seuil, coll. « Cadre Rouge », 1 October 1973
 Thierry Ardisson, La Bilbe, Paris, Éditions du Seuil, 1975
 Thierry Ardisson, Rive droite, Paris, Éditions Albin Michel, 11 February 1983, 216 p.
 Thierry Ardisson, Louis XX – Contre-enquête sur la Monarchie 1986, sold over 100,000 copies.
 Thierry Ardisson, Pondichéry, Éditions Albin Michel, 1994,
 Thierry Ardisson and Philippe Kieffer, Confessions d'un Babyboomer, 2006 sold over 100,000 copies.

Essays 
 Thierry Ardisson, Louis XX, Paris, Éditions Gallimard, coll. « Folio », 11 mars 1988, 249 p.
 Thierry Ardisson, Pondichéry, 1994
 Thierry Ardisson, Cyril Drouet & Joseph Vebret, Dictionnaire des provocateurs, Paris, Plon, 25 novembre 2010
 Thierry Ardisson (collectif), Rock Critics, Paris, Don Quichotte, 6 mai 2010, 304 p.
 Thierry Ardisson, Le Petit livre blanc. Pourquoi je suis monarchiste, Paris, Plon, 4 octobre 2012

Autobiography 
 Thierry Ardisson, Les années provoc, Paris, Éditions Gallimard, coll. « Docs Témoignage », 1er novembre 1998, 347 p.
 Thierry Ardisson & Philippe Kieffer, Confessions d'un babyboomer, Paris, Flammarion, 15 octobre 2004, 358 p.

Television 
 Thierry Ardisson & Laurent Baffie, Tu l'as dit Baffie ! Concentré de vannes, Paris, Le Cherche midi, coll. « Le Sens de l'humour », 21 April 2005
 Thierry Ardisson & Jean-Luc Maître, Descentes de police, Paris, Love Me Tender/Business Multimedia, 1984, 139 p.
 Thierry Ardisson (collectif), Paris dernière. Paris la nuit et sa bande son, Paris, M6 Éditions, 10 November 2010, 320 p.
 Thierry Ardisson & Philippe Kieffer, Tout le monde en a parlé, Paris, Flammarion, 2012, 360 p.
 Thierry Ardisson & Philippe Kieffer, Magnéto Serge !, Paris, Flammarion, 2013, 300 p.

Contributions 
 Thierry Ardisson (collectif), Dix ans pour rien ? Les années 80, Paris, Éditions du Rocher, coll. « Lettre recommandée », 1990
 Thierry Ardisson (postface), Peut-on penser à la télévision ? La Culture sur un plateau, Paris, Éditions Le Bord de l'eau/INA, coll. « Penser les médias », 2010, 290 p.

Videography 
 Thierry Ardisson, Paris interdit. Découvrez les endroits les plus interdits de Paris, documentaire, 1997. (VHS)
 Thierry Ardisson, Les Années Double Jeu, Arcades Vidéo, 2010. (ASIN B00443PSOM)
 Thierry Ardisson, Les Années Lunettes Noires pour Nuits Blanches, Arcades Vidéo, 2010. (ASIN B00443PSO2)
 Thierry Ardisson, Les Années Tout le monde en parle, Arcades Vidéo, 2010. (ASIN B00443PSOW)
 Thierry Ardisson, La Boite noire de l'homme en noir, Arcades Vidéo, 2010. (ASIN B00443PSNS)
 Thierry Ardisson, Les Années Paris Première, M6 Vidéo, 2011. (ASIN B005JYUWSW)
 Collectif, Où va la création audiovisuelle, BnF/Ina, 201168.,

Music 
 Instant Sex. Le Disque souvenir de l'émission culte Double Jeu de Thierry Ardisson, vinyle, 1993.
 La Musique de Tout le monde en parle, compilation, Naïve, 2002.
He is cited in a song by Renaud, Les Bobos : « Ardisson et son pote Marco » (référence à Marc-Olivier Fogiel).

See also 
Frigide Barjot
Frédéric Taddeï
Marc-Edouard Nabe
Karl Zéro

References

External links 
 Thierry Ardisson official site

1949 births
Living people
French television presenters
People from Creuse